The 2016 Atlantic 10 Men's Soccer Tournament, known as the 2016 Atlantic 10 Men's Soccer Tournament Presented by Amtrak for sponsorship reasons, was the nineteenth edition of the tournament. It determined the Atlantic 10 Conference's automatic berth into the 2016 NCAA Division I Men's Soccer Championship. Dayton enter the tournament as the defending champions.

The Fordham Rams won the Atlantic 10 title, besting the VCU Rams, 3–2 in penalty kicks in the championship match. It was Fordham's first A-10 title since 2014. VCU previously made the A-10 final in 2012, and 2015, losing both times.

The tournament was hosted by Davidson College and all matches were contested at Alumni Soccer Stadium.

Seeds
The top eight teams participate in the tournament. The seeding is based on the program's conference record during the 2016 Atlantic 10 Conference season.

Bracket

Results

Quarterfinals

Semifinals

Final

References 

Atlantic 10 Men's Soccer Tournament
Atlantic 10 Men's Soccer